Kadhal Kirukkan is a 2003 Indian Tamil-language romantic thriller film, written and directed by Sakthi Chidambaram, starring Parthiban, Richa Pallod, Vineeth and Vadivelu. The film, produced by A. Ahamed, was released on 26 December 2003. The film is the Tamil remake of Hindi film Deewangee (2002).

Plot

Saravanan and Selvi Maha are childhood friends. Saravanan is so madly in love with Maha that it turns him into a killer. Knifing or gunning down anyone who comes in the way of Maha and himself, is almost child's play for Saravanan. From an old man to a posse of policemen, his victims are many and the mayhem is endless. But listlessness and dejection set in when Maha tells him that she is not in love with him. And then it's time for the denouement.

Cast

Parthiban as Saravanan (Palani)
Richa Pallod as Selvi Maha
Vineeth as Lawyer Gautham
Vadivelu as Kalyanasundaram
Sriman as a Police officer
Thalaivasal Vijay as a Lawyer
Raj Kapoor as Ravi Varma
Udaya Prakash as Kavidhangel
Singamuthu as Marriage broker
Devadarshini as Doctor
Manobala as Doctor
Meera Krishnan as Gautham's mother
C. Duraipandian as P. Krishnan
Keerthana as P. Krishnan's wife
Krishnamoorthy as Astrologer
Vincent Roy as Saravanan's father
S. Rajasekar as Selvi Maha's father
Anjali Devi as Saravanan's mother
Srividya Shankar as Selvi Maha's mother
Bonda Mani as Shop owner
Vijay Ganesh as Shop owner
Boys Rajan as Music producer
King Kong as Servant
Dhadha Muthukumar as Bride's father
Chelladurai as Bride's father
Sivanarayanamoorthy as Land owner
Priyanka as Police officer in Mufti
Ramdoss as Servant (uncredited role)
Nagendra Prasad in a special appearance
Junior Silk in a special appearance

Soundtrack

The film score and the soundtrack were composed by Deva. The soundtrack, released in 2003, features 6 tracks. Lyrics were written by Pa. Vijay, Kabilan, Snehan, Deva Kumar and Sakthi Chidambaram.

References

External links

2003 films
Films scored by Deva (composer)
2000s Tamil-language films
Indian romantic thriller films
2000s romantic thriller films
Films directed by Sakthi Chidambaram